Cudworth Municipal Airport  is located adjacent to Cudworth, Saskatchewan, Canada.

See also 
 List of airports in Saskatchewan
 Cudworth Airport

References

External links 
 Page about this airport on COPA's Places to Fly airport directory

Registered aerodromes in Saskatchewan
Hoodoo No. 401, Saskatchewan